Peter Fleming may refer to:
 Peter Fleming (writer) (1907–1971), British writer, older brother of Ian Fleming
 Pete Fleming (1928–1956), martyred missionary
 Peter Fleming (tennis) (born 1955), American tennis player
 Peter E. Fleming Jr. (1929–2009), American criminal-defense lawyer
 Peter J. Fleming, British professor of engineering

See also
 Peter Flemming (born 1967), Canadian actor
 Peter Flemming (artist) (born 1973), Canadian installation artist